Shane Lee Simpson (born 1954 or 1955) is a Canadian politician, who served as MLA for Vancouver-Hastings in the Canadian province of British Columbia from 2005 to 2020. He was first elected to the Legislative Assembly in the 2005 election.

He is a member of the British Columbia New Democratic Party and served as the official opposition critic for the environment from 2005 to 2009. He served as critic for Housing, ICBC, the BC Lottery Corporation and the BC Liquor Distribution Branch from 2009 until 2012.  In addition Simpson was the NDP Caucus Chair.

Early life and career
Born and raised in East Vancouver, Shane Simpson has been active in his community for over 30 years. He led the fight to stop Lafarge from building a concrete batch plant beside New Brighton Park, a popular and historically significant park facing Burrard Inlet.

In his professional career, Simpson has worked as the Director of Policy and Communications for Smart Growth BC, Chair of the Vancouver City Planning Commission, Instructor in the Community Economic Development program at Simon Fraser University, Executive Director of the Worker Ownership Resource Center, Legislative Coordinator for the Canadian Union of Public Employees, coordinator and fundraiser for the Ray Cam Cooperative Center, executive assistant to former Vancouver East MP Margaret Mitchell, and as a self-employed consultant on business and economic development for labour, co-operative and non-profit groups.

Simpson was the recipient of the Queen's Golden Jubilee Medal for his contribution to community in 2002. In 1992, he was awarded the Governor General's 125th Anniversary Commemorative Medal for Community Service.

He lives in East Vancouver with his wife and daughter.

Politics
He was first elected to the Legislative Assembly in the 2005 British Columbia general election. He was re-elected in 2009, 2013, and 2017.

On September 4, 2020, Simpson announced that he wouldn't run for re-election in the next general election.

Election results

References

External links
 Shane Simpson
 Profile with British Columbia New Democratic Party Caucus page
 Profile at Legislative Assembly of British Columbia

British Columbia New Democratic Party MLAs
1950s births
Living people
Members of the Executive Council of British Columbia
Politicians from Vancouver
21st-century Canadian politicians